Anna Hruby (born 1960) is an Australian actress and voice over artist band TV commercial advertiser, who has appeared in many Australian television series and theatre productions. She is the daughter of late actress, entertainer and television personality Joy Hruby.

Career 
Hruby's first recurring role was in the TV miniseries Seven Little Australians. She featured in the TV serial The Young Doctors as Sandy Pearce, girlfriend of Roger Gordon in from 1977 to 1978. Hruby then achieved recognition for her role in Prisoner as Paddy Lawson.

She has also appeared in TV series such as Sons and Daughters as Tracy Kingsford, A Country Practice, All Saints, Cop Shop and mini-series such as The Harp in the South and  Poor Man's Orange. She was a regular cast member on Home and Away, playing Judith Ackroyd and Fireflies, playing Rebekah Sharp.

Hruby also works as a voice-over artist in advertisements and television network promotions for Foxtel, the Channel 7. She is also the current voice artist for Telstra, Australia's largest telecommunications company. Often known as 'The Telstra Lady', she provides a majority of recorded messages for Telstra, such as "Your call could not be connected" and other menu prompts.

Filmography 

FILM

TELEVISION

References

External links
 

1960 births
Living people
Australian film actresses
Australian soap opera actresses
20th-century Australian actresses
21st-century Australian actresses